Brachyurophis is a genus of elapid snakes known as shovel-nosed snakes, so named because of their shovel-nosed snout which is used to burrow. The genus has eight recognized species, which are all found in Australia.

Species
Brachyurophis approximans  – North-western shovel-nosed snake
Brachyurophis australis  – (Australian) coral snake, Eastern shovel-nosed snake
Brachyurophis campbelli  – Cape York shovel-nosed snake
Brachyurophis fasciolatus  – Narrow-banded shovel-nosed snake
Brachyurophis incinctus  – Unbanded shovel-nosed snake
Brachyurophis morrisi  – Arnhem shovel-nosed snake
Brachyurophis roperi  – Northern shovel-nosed snake
Brachyurophis semifasciatus  – Southern shovel-nosed snake

The above species are sometimes included in the genus Simoselaps, sensu lato.

Nota bene: A binomial authority in parentheses indicates that the species was originally described in a genus other than Brachyurophis.

Geographic distribution
 B. approximans - Western Australia North West Coastal and Western Plateau.
 B. australis - New South Wales, Queensland, South Australia and Victoria.

 B. fasciolatus - New South Wales, Queensland, Western Australia, South Australia and Northern Territory.
 B. incinctus - Northern Territory and Queensland.
 B. morrisi - Northern Territory North Coast.
 B. roperi - Northern Territory and Western Australia North Coast.
 B. semifasciata - Western Australia, South Australia, Queensland and Northern Territory.

References

Further reading
Günther A (1863). "On new Species of Snakes in the Collection of the British Museum". Ann. Mag. Nat. Hist., Third Series 11: 20–25. (Brachyurophis, new genus, p. 21).

External links
 Australian Faunal Directory 
 OZCAM | Western Australian Museum

 
Snake genera
Taxa named by Albert Günther
Snakes of Australia